Lincoln Way is a major east–west thoroughfare in western San Francisco, California. It has two lanes for traffic and two tracks for streetcars. 

The street's eastern end starts at Arguello Boulevard and runs westbound through the Sunset District to the Great Highway at Ocean Beach.

Lincoln Way runs along and defines the entire southern side of Golden Gate Park.

Route description 
Lincoln Way starts at the Great Highway near the western coast of San Francisco. It then intersects with several major streets, including Martin Luther King Junior Drive, California State Route 1 (19th Avenue/Crossover Drive), and Kezar Drive. It crosses over Sunset Boulevard without an interchange. It then terminates at Arguello Boulevard, becoming Frederick Street.

History 
Lincoln Way was originally called H Street before 1909. In 1917, there was a railroad running through the road's median. H Street and the railroad were the first routes to the Outer Sunset area. These were later removed.

References 

Streets in San Francisco
Sunset District, San Francisco